Saarjärve is a village in Mustvee Parish, Jõgeva County in eastern Estonia. , the population of the village was 26.

References 

Villages in Jõgeva County